Leucocoprinus acer is a species of mushroom producing fungus in the family Agaricaceae.

Taxonomy 
It was first described in 1988 by the mycologist Jörg Raithelhuber who classified it as Leucocoprinus acer.

Description 
Leucocoprinus acer is a small white dapperling mushroom. Raithelhuber only described the species from a dried specimen and an illustration deposited at the herbarium of the University of Buenos Aires a decade earlier so the description may be incomplete.

Cap: 1.5-2.5 cm wide when mature, it starts hemispherical before expanding to convex. The surface is very pale, whitish with a shiny (micante), powdery (pruinose) coating whilst the centre disc has a pale red ochre colour (described as 'sinopicus' in the Latin description which refers to the pigment from Sinop, Turkey) or light chestnut brown in the German description. Stem: 3.5-4.5cm long and 2-4mm thick with a base that is not bulbous or only slightly bulbous, cylindrical. The Latin diagnosis describes the surface as pale (presumably whitish though not explicitly specified) with a red ochre colour at the base whilst the German only says that the stem is light chestnut brown. A stem ring is present and 'distinct' but no further details are supplied. Gills: White, moderately crowded (subconfertae) with the attachment described as sinuate to subfree. This would be unusual for a Leucocoprinus species as they are typically free with a collar. Spores: Subglobose or ovoid, smooth with an indistinct germ pore that is not detectable in some spores. Weakly dextrinoid. 8.8-10 x 6.5-7.2 µm. Cystidia: Claviform or truncated. Taste: bitter.

Since many Leucocoprinus species can exhibit a change of colour when dry and as no fresh material was examined to describe this species it is possible that this species may present with different colouration when fresh.

Etymology 
The specific epithet acer is Latin for bitter and the species is presumably named for the taste noted in the description, however a bitter taste is not unique to this Leucocoprinus species.

Habitat and distribution 
The specimens studied by Raithelhuber were found in Temperley, a district in Greater Buenos Aires, Argentina in 1972. They were observed to be growing in large groups in the morning.

References 

acer
Fungi described in 1988
Fungi of South America